Royal Canin is a French manufacturer of cat and dog food. A subsidiary of Mars, Incorporated, the company also undertakes research into the formulation and testing of breed and symptom specific nutritional requirements of dogs and cats.

The company was established by French veterinary surgeon Jean Cathary, after he successfully treated a number of skin and coat conditions in pets by feeding them a cereal-based diet he prepared in his garage. After importing an extruder from the United States, the company was the first to manufacture dry pet food in France. Aimed primarily at breeders, production steadily increased and distribution extended further into the European market.  Royal Canin was sold to the Guyomarc'h Group in 1972, and underwent a further period of expansion, especially in the area of research and development, before being purchased by the Paribas Bank in 1990. The company was floated on the French stock exchange but removed later after it was sold to Mars, Incorporated in 2001.

Royal Canin offers a range of puppy foods that are specifically formulated to meet the nutritional needs of growing dogs. They offer different formulas based on the breed size, activity level, and life stage of the puppy. Some of the ingredients commonly found in their puppy food formulas include high-quality proteins, vitamins, minerals, and antioxidants.

Royal Canin is considered a high-quality brand by many pet owners and veterinarians, although some people may find their products to be more expensive than other brands. It’s always important to consult with your veterinarian before making any changes to your puppy’s diet, including switching to a new brand of food.

History 
The company was established by the French veterinary surgeon Jean Cathary in 1968. He had a veterinary practice in a village in the Gard region of France and was concerned many people's pets were being presented with a variety of health problems, especially skin and coat conditions. Convinced the cause was dietary, Cathary devised a cereal–based recipe, which he prepared in an oven in his garage.

The diet successfully alleviated the problems pets were presented with, so in 1968, Cathary registered the food with the trademark “Royal Canin”. He closed his veterinary practice to concentrate on manufacturing and distributing the feed. An extruder was imported from the U.S. and Royal Canin became the first manufacturer of dry pet food in France and the first European company to use an extruder.  The target market was primarily breeders and German Shepherd associations; television advertising was used to promote the product, something which was not being undertaken by competitors.

Production steadily increased and in 1970, the company was incorporated as "Royal Canin S. A."; a larger factory was opened in Aimargues and began distribution throughout Europe. Forty staff were employed in the annual production of five–thousand five hundred tons of feed. A subsidiary, Royal Canin Iberica, was established in Spain. In March 1972, Cathary sold the company to the Guyomarc'h Group, a much larger, family-run animal feed business founded by Jean Guyomarc’h in 1954, which specialised in livestock feed.

The period under the ownership of Guyomarc'h saw a marked expansion of the company, particularly in the area of research and development. A dedicated research centre was opened in Saint-Nolff, Brittany, during 1973. Over the ten years up to 1982 additional subsidiaries were also set up in other European countries. These included Italy, Sweden, Belgium, Spain, Germany and Denmark. Another factory was built in northern France to service sales in the countries of the north of Europe.

The Guyomarc'h group of companies was purchased by the Paribas Bank in 1990. Royal Canin recorded a loss in 1993; the following year the Guyomarc'h group was divided into four separate businesses, one of which remained as Royal Canin. The bank wished to sell Royal Canin but its chairman managed to persuade it to list it on the Paris stock exchange instead, which took place in 1997. Forty–three percent of the company was floated on the stock market and it raised the company's valuation to four and half billion francs. The additional revenue raised provided the funding to buy Crown Pet Foods in 1999 and the James Wellbeloved brand in 2000.

The bank sold its holding in the company to Mars, Incorporated in July 2001 for in excess of one and a half billion euros. The majority of this payment, almost ninety–three percent, was for "goodwill". The European Commission only agreed to the takeover by Mars if Royal Canin disposed of some assets to Agrolimen, a Spanish company. Royal Canin was removed from the stock exchange listing after the take over by Mars.

In March 2004, Royal Canin acquired the US and Canadian veterinary-grade food brands IVD, Medi–Cal and Techni–Cal from Del Monte Foods for $82.5 million.

The company was one of the many brands affected by the 2007 pet food recalls. As at 30 April 2012, the FDA had reported no subsequent Class I, II, or III recalls by Royal Canin.

By 2008, as much as eighty percent of Royal Canin's one and a half billion euro revenue was generated from sales outside France. The number of staff employed worldwide was around four thousand five hundred.

Research 
Royal Canin bases the production of its feeds on scientific research and set up its first research centre in St-Nolff in 1973; a subsequent research centre was established in Missouri in the late 1980s, and a research facility was also opened in Brazil. Products are tested on a "focus group" of 80 cats and 250 dogs. Daniel Cloche was one of the scientists who first worked at the company's French research facility and was described as "one of the pioneers in researching bone–related disorders and diseases among dogs". Research indicated bone problems in large dogs could be dietary, so different recipes were developed to specifically address this. In 1980, Royal Canin brought out a new feed called AGR, especially for puppies categorised as large breeds. At that time, the company also turned its attention towards producing cat foods to suit specific dietary requirements.

Henri Lagarde was chairman of the company during the 1990s, and drove the implementation three core policies. Firstly, the physiology and biology of pets should be studied to increase the company's knowledge base. Secondly, all products had to address specific needs; this was further endorsed by the Research and Development section having mandatory instructions that "no veterinarian or university should be able to refute any of Royal Canin's nutritional arguments". Finally, animals and their nutritional requirements were to be treated with "knowledge and respect" rather than being humanised. The company theme became "knowledge and respect".

Veterinary and peer-reviewed journals 
With the help of academics, the company also produces encyclopedias about dog and cat breeds, which have been translated into fifteen languages. There are also books on breeding, nutrition and publications aimed at breeders and veterinary surgeons. Royal Canin also published the scientific quarterly titled FOCUS which was circulated to in excess of seventy thousand veterinarians worldwide in eleven different languages. FOCUS is now called Veterinary Focus magazine. This is in addition to the one thousand four hundred fifty veterinary literatures produced for the Waltham Centre for Pet Nutrition.

Recruitment of specialists and sponsorships 
In 1994, Lagarde was determined the company should be seen as dealing with "specialists". He insisted that the word "traditional" must never be used and the word was removed from every document and company computer file being replaced by "specialist" instead.

There are teams of trained veterinary technicians to help and advise breeders and other professionals. The company coined a new description for its teams of trained sales staff as "cynotechnicians", who were already well established and passionate about the canine world; some were show judges or had gained an international reputation for their breeding skills. The company also sponsors and participates in thousands of cat and dog shows each year. The company withdrew from sponsoring the UK Contest of Champions event in 2009 but was quoted as stating it was increasing its sponsorship of dog shows.

In 2013, Four Paws, an international animal welfare group, accused Royal Canin of sponsoring events that included illegal bear-baiting in Ukraine. The company confirmed the allegations and promised to take action to put an end to its sponsorship of such events. Subsequently, the company made a commitment to support the rescue of bears used and began negotiations with the group to determine a detailed project plan.

Factories 
Royal Canin's head office is in Aimargues, southern France. There are twelve production facilities worldwide, in addition to Aimargues including at Cambrai in northern France; Johannesburg, South Africa; Descalvado, Brazil; and González Catán, near Buenos Aires, Argentina.

The plant located in Rolla, Missouri, produces only dry pet feeds. Royal Canin was fined for "violating the Clean Water Act" in 2005 at this site.

In 2004, production facilities at Dmitrov, near Moscow, Russia, opened. Royal Canin committed twelve million euros in the construction of the factory and anticipated annual production of twenty–two thousand tons a year.

The Polish government announced construction was to start in February 2006 on a fifty million euro factory in Niepołomice, Poland, which would provide employment for in excess of one hundred fifty staff. At the time of the announcement, it was described as "the ninth and most modern of all of those which belong to the company"; this was because of the laboratory that was to be included in the design.

The company's first UK facility, at Castle Cary, near Bristol, opened in December 2007, two years later than expected. Annual production was expected to be two thousand tons, employing eighty staff. Although objections were raised by some local residents, others welcomed the facility. The Environment Agency received complaints of an "unbearable smell" after production started. The company installed carbon filters and a new condenser at a cost of a million pounds in attempts to address the problem.

In 2008, the company invested seventy–three million dollars in the construction of a factory at Guelph, Ontario, Canada.

A factory at North Sioux City, South Dakota, USA, was originally purchased by Mars in 2007 and worked under the Mars Petcare brand. This was then re-branded to Royal Canin in 2011, where it manufactures both wet and dry pet food.

Royal Canin's twelfth production facility was fully built at the end of 2009 and is located in Shanghai, China.

2016 saw the addition of Fremont, Nebraska and in 2017 Lebanon, Tennessee. A new plant has been opened in 2017 in South Korea in Gimje, North Jeolla Province.

Notes

References 

Bibliography

Cat food brands
Dog food brands
Mars brands
Companies formerly listed on the Paris Bourse
French companies established in 1968
French brands